Atelopus longirostris is a species of harlequin frog, a member of the family of true toads (Bufonidae). It has been recorded only in northern Ecuador. Records from Colombia probably represent different species. As of mid-2017, it is listed as extinct by the IUCN, but was rediscovered in 2016 after more than two decade with no sightings, likely because the IUCN last assessed it in 2004. The scientific name of this species means "long-snout" and the species has been named in Spanish as the jambato hocicudo (long-snouted jambato). Common names longnose stubfoot toad, scrawny stubfoot-toad, and longnose sharlequin frog have been coined for it.

Status and rediscovery
The species has been classified as extinct (and as of mid-2017, remains listed as such, pending an update by the IUCN), due to huge declines probably related to the disease chytridiomycosis, climate change and habitat loss. The species was not recorded between 1989 and 2016, despite some searching in historical localities. It was rediscovered in March 2016 when four adults (two males and two females) were located in Imbabura in two small forest patches in an area heavily modified for agriculture and livestock. These individuals tested negative for chytridiomycosis and were brought to the Jambatu Research and Conservation Center in the hope of establishing a captive breeding population.

Taxonomy and systematics
Atelopus longirostris was described by Edward Drinker Cope in 1868 based on a specimen collected by James Orton and which now appears to be lost. The type locality was stated as "Valley of Quito", but this is presumed to be erroneous.

Arteaga and colleagues (2013) state that populations from Carchi and Esmeraldas Provinces need taxonomic revision and exclude them from the range of this species.

Distribution and habitat 
Tapia and colleagues give a slightly different historic range that includes Imbabura, Cotopaxi, Pichincha, and Santo Domingo de los Tsáchilas Provinces and a narrower altitudinal range, .

Atelopus longirostris inhabits lowland (but see above) and montane tropical rainforests. Breeding takes place in streams. Populations discovered in 2016 were in isolated, small patches of native forest within a heavily modified landscape. They were all found at night, perched on leaves about half a metre above the ground, some distance away from the nearest rivers.

Description 
Adult males measure  and females  in snout–vent length. However, Tapia and colleagues report two smaller adult females, measuring  SVL. Atelopus longirostris has a slender body with long limbs. The snout is pronounced and has a comparatively sharp point. The fingers are fleshy and have some basal webbing; the toes are more heavily webbed. The dorsum is brown with yellow or cream rounded spots. The flanks are dark brown or black. The venter is whitish with some brown suffusion in the throat and chest.

References

longirostris
Amphibians of the Andes
Amphibians of Ecuador
Endemic fauna of Ecuador
Taxa named by Edward Drinker Cope
Amphibians described in 1868